Brittany Farms-The Highlands is a census-designated place (CDP) in Bucks County, Pennsylvania, United States. The population was 3,695 at the 2010 census. At the 2000 census, it was listed as "Brittany Farms-Highlands" CDP.

Geography
Brittany Farms-The Highlands is located at  (40.272656, -75.215680).

Demographics

As of the 2010 census, Brittany Farms-The Highlands was 90.8% White, 2.0% Black or African American, 3.7% Asian, 0.2% some other race, and 0.9% were two or more races. 2.5% of the population was of Hispanic  or Latino ancestry.

At the 2000 census there were 3,268 people, 1,415 households, and 942 families living in the CDP. The population density was 2,729.6 people per square mile (1,051.5/km). There were 1,441 housing units at an average density of 1,203.6/sq mi (463.6/km).  The racial makeup of the CDP was 95.99% White, 1.35% African American, 0.03% Native American, 1.01% Asian, 0.70% from other races, and 0.92% from two or more races. Hispanic or Latino of any race were 1.25%.

There were 1,415 households, 27.3% had children under the age of 18 living with them, 55.9% were married couples living together, 8.6% had a female householder with no husband present, and 33.4% were non-families. 28.6% of households were made up of individuals, and 11.3% were one person aged 65 or older. The average household size was 2.31 and the average family size was 2.84.

The age distribution was 21.0% under the age of 18, 4.2% from 18 to 24, 31.2% from 25 to 44, 25.6% from 45 to 64, and 18.0% 65 or older. The median age was 41 years. For every 100 females, there were 87.3 males. For every 100 females age 18 and over, there were 83.6 males.

The median household income was $60,786 and the median family income  was $67,340. Males had a median income of $57,292 versus $35,799 for females. The per capita income for the CDP was $28,067. About 1.2% of families and 2.4% of the population were below the poverty line, including 2.7% of those under age 18 and 3.5% of those age 65 or over.

References

Census-designated places in Bucks County, Pennsylvania
Census-designated places in Pennsylvania